John J. "Jack" Daley (June 21, 1923 – June 15, 2000) was an American high school teacher and politician from Vermont. A Democrat, he was most notable for his service as Mayor of  Rutland (1961–1965, 1981–1987), and lieutenant governor (1965–1969). In his later years, Daley served two terms in the Vermont House of Representatives (1991–1995).

Biography
John James Daley was born in Rutland on June 21, 1923.  He graduated from Mount St. Joseph Academy in 1942 and joined the United States Marine Corps for World War II, serving with the 1st Marine Division in the Pacific Theatre of Operations, including the invasion of Okinawa and assignment to China.

After the war Daley completed his education at Norwich University, receiving his bachelor's degree in 1949 and embarking on a career as a pharmaceutical sales representative.  He later became a teacher and coach at Rutland Junior High School.

A Democrat, Daley served on the Rutland Board of Aldermen from 1956 to 1960, including two years as president of the board.  From 1961 to 1965 Daley served as Rutland's mayor.

Daley served two terms (1965–1969) as the 70th lieutenant governor of Vermont. Elected during the governorship of Philip H. Hoff, they were the first Democrats to hold Vermont's top two state government posts since the founding of the Republican Party in the 1850s.

In 1968 Daley ran unsuccessfully for governor, losing to Deane C. Davis.

Daley was also a candidate for presidential elector during the 1972 presidential election (Vermont was carried by Republican incumbent President Richard Nixon).

From 1969 to 1981 he taught social studies and coached football at Rutland Junior High School, and he was also a football and basketball referee for amateur sports in the Rutland area for many years.

Daley served as Rutland's mayor for a second time from 1981 to 1987.  In 1990 Daley was elected to the Vermont House of Representatives, serving two terms.

Personal life
Daley married Mary Creed in 1947. They had 11 children.

John J. Daley died in Rutland on June 15, 2000.  He is buried in Rutland's Evergreen Cemetery.

See also

List of lieutenant governors of Vermont
List of mayors of Rutland, Vermont

References

External links
 John J. Daley at The Political Graveyard
 Obituary, John J. Daley in the Rutland Herald

2000 deaths
1923 births
Lieutenant Governors of Vermont
People from Rutland (city), Vermont
Military personnel from Vermont
Norwich University alumni
Democratic Party members of the Vermont House of Representatives
United States Marines
United States Marine Corps personnel of World War II
Burials at Evergreen Cemetery (Rutland, Vermont)
Mayors of places in Vermont
Vermont city council members
20th-century American politicians